Step on a Bug is the sole studio album by Seattle-based grunge pioneers The U-Men. It was released in 1988 on Black Label Records.

Track listing
 "Whistlin' Pete"
 "2 X 4"
 "A Three Year Old Could Do That"
 "Juice Party"
 "Flea Circus"
 "Too Good to Be Food"
 "Willie Dong Hurts Dogs"
 "Papa Doesn't Love His Children Anymore"
 "Pay the Bubba"
 "Solid Action" (bonus track on 1990 UK CD version)
 "Dig It a Hole" (bonus track on 1990 UK CD version)

References

1988 debut albums
The U-Men albums